Quebec is a French-speaking province in Eastern Canada.

Quebec may also refer to:
 Province of Quebec (1763–1791), a British colony in North America
 Quebec City, the capital city of the province of Quebec

Areas in Canada
 Québec (electoral district), Canadian federal electoral district
 Quebec (census division), a census division and county-municipal territorial unit of the province
 Communauté métropolitaine de Québec, an administrative division of the province comprising the Quebec City metropolitan area
 Québec administrative region, the former name of the Capitale-Nationale administrative region of Quebec
 Quebec County, Quebec, a historic county comprising Quebec City and its environs

Places in the United Kingdom
 Quebec, County Durham, a village in England, in the United Kingdom
 Quebec, West Sussex, a village in England, in the United Kingdom

Places in the United States
 Quebec, Connecticut, a neighborhood in the Borough of Danielson in Windham County, Connecticut
 Quebec, Montana, an unincorporated community in Montana
 Quebeck, Tennessee, United States

Arts
 Quebec (album), a 2003 album by Ween
 Quebec (1951 film), a 1951 film directed by George Templeton about the Patriotes Rebellion
 Quebec (2007 film), a 2007 film directed by Steve Conrad
 Québec: Duplessis and After..., a 1972 film directed by Denys Arcand
 Quebec, une ville, a 1988 film directed by Gilles Carle
 Ike Quebec (1918–1963), jazz tenor saxophonist
 Xebec (studio), a subsidiary of the Japanese animation studio Production I.G.
 The Quebecers, a professional wrestling tag team in the World Wrestling Federation

Other uses
 Battle of Quebec (disambiguation), numerous battles in or near Quebec
 "Quebec", the letter Q in the NATO phonetic alphabet
 Project 615 submarine, the NATO reporting name for the Soviet Project 615 submarine
 HMS Quebec, three ships and a shore establishment of the Royal Navy
 HMCS Quebec
 HMCS Quebec, a cruiser of the Second World War, formerly HMS Uganda and HMCS Uganda (1952–1956)
 HMCS Ville de Quebec
 HMCS Ville de Québec (FFH 332), Halifax-class frigate serving the  Canadian Armed Forces since 1993
 CSTC HMCS Quebec, the Cadet Summer Training Centre HMCS Quebec
 Quebec platelet disorder, a genetic blood disorder
 45555 Quebec, a British LMS Jubilee Class locomotive
 Pingualuit crater, Meteor crater once known as the New Quebec Crater, Ungava Crater, and Chubb Crater

See also
 Quebecer (disambiguation)
 Québécois (disambiguation)
 Quebec City (disambiguation)
 Ville de Québec (disambiguation)